Punch drunk syndrome is the medical condition chronic traumatic encephalopathy.

Punch drunk, punchdrunk, or punch-drunk may also refer to:

 Punch Drunk (TV series), an English TV programme
 Punchdrunk (theatre company), an English theatre company
 Punchdrunk International, a subsidiary production company 
Punch Drunks, a 1934 film by The Three Stooges

See also
Punch-Drunk Love, a 2002 film by Paul Thomas Anderson